The American Psychological Association of Graduate Students (APAGS) is a constituency group within the American Psychological Association that represents APA graduate student affiliate members. Founded in 1988, APAGS currently represents approximately one-third of all members of the American Psychological Association, making it one of the largest constituency groups within the association and the largest group of organized graduate psychology students worldwide. APAGS was formed by David Pilon and Scott Mesh who were graduate students in clinical psychology. David Pilon was then the president of SOSIP (Society of Students in Psychology of the Ontario Psychological Association) and Scott Mesh was president of CPSA (Clinical Psychology Student Association of Greater New York). Most leaders in organized psychology at the time thought that APAGS was a bad idea and cited the fact that students graduate as the reason such an organization would fail. However, Pilon and Mesh found friends in psychologists Ray Fowler, Charlie Spielberger, Pierre Ritchie, Ellin Bloch, Virginia Staudt Sexton, John Hogan, Jeff Nevid and Louis Primavera. These psychologists helped Pilon and Mesh lay the groundwork to form APAGS at the August, 1988 meeting of the American Psychological Association in Atlanta, Georgia.

Since its beginnings in 1988 with about 18,000 members, APAGS has grown to one-third of APA's total membership and has become one of the largest constituency groups within APA. APAGS is composed of a governing committee, five subcommittees and several task forces, and has increased its prominence and voice by gaining voting seats in APA governance groups, such as the Committee on Accreditation and APA's Council of Representatives.

APAGS Chairs through the years
 
 Scott Mesh and David Pilon	(1988—1989)
 Dawn Royall 	(1989—1990)
 James Campbell	(1990—1991)
 Robert Rella	(1991—1992)
 Bridget Cabibi	(1992—1993)
 Randy Hofer	(1993—1994)
 Mathew Simpson	(1994—1995)
 Miguel Ybarra	(1995—1996)
 Barbara Beauchamp	(1996—1997)
 Mitchell Prinstein	(1997—1998)
 Marcia Moody	(1998—1999)
 Carol Williams-Nickelson	(1999—2000)
 Marcus Patterson	(2000—2001)
 Derek Snyder	(2001—2002)
 Christopher W. Loftis	(2002—2003)
 Jennifer Doran (2014-2015)
 Emily Voelkel (2015-2016)
 Christine Jehu (2016-2017)
Ian Gutierrez (2017)
Justin Karr (2018)
Roseann Fish Getchell (2019)
Blanka Angyal (2020)
Mary Fernandes (2021)
Tiffany Parisi (2022)
Quincy Guinadi (2023)

References

American Psychological Association